is a Japanese footballer currently playing as a midfielder for Iwate Grulla Morioka.

Career statistics

Club
.

Notes

References

1998 births
Living people
Kindai University alumni
Japanese footballers
Association football midfielders
J2 League players
J3 League players
Iwate Grulla Morioka players